

A

B

C

D

E

F

G

H

I

J

L

M

N

O

P

R

S

U

V

W

Organizations and personnel
Abb